Rowing Stadium may refer to:

 Töölö Rowing Stadium, in Helsinki, Finland
 Rodrigo de Freitas Lagoon, on Rio de Janeiro, Brazil